Lutfur Rahman is a male Islamic given name, meaning kindness of the Most Merciful. Notable bearers of the name include 

 Mohammad Lutfur Rahman (1889–1936), Bengali author
Muhammad Lutfar Rahman (born 1942),  vice chancellor of Islamic University, Bangladesh
 Lutfur Rahman (poet) (born 1941), Indian poet in the Urdu language
 Lutfor Rahman (born 1962), Bangladeshi physician
 Lutfur Rahman (British politician) (born 1965), British local politician
 Lutfar Rahman Sarkar (died 2013), Bangladeshi economist
 Lutfor Rahman Riton, Bangladeshi writer of children's literature
Lutfur Rahman (Bangladeshi MP), Bangladeshi politician

Arabic masculine given names